The Man Who Changed His Name is a 1934 British crime film directed by Henry Edwards and starring Lyn Harding, Betty Stockfeld and Leslie Perrins. It was based on the play The Man Who Changed His Name by Edgar Wallace. It was made as a quota quickie at Twickenham Studios. The film's art direction was by James A. Carter.

Synopsis
A man appears to be being tricked out of a valuable piece of land in Canada which contains lucrative silver deposits by his wife's lover. Both the potential villains begin to have second thoughts when gradually come to suspect that their intended victim, having since changed his name, is in fact a notorious killer from Canada. Eventually it transpires he was not the murderer, but is only using it as a trick to push his wife and her lover to reveal their deception out of fear.

Cast
 Lyn Harding as Selby Clive  
 Betty Stockfeld as Nita Clive  
 Leslie Perrins as Frank Ryan  
 Ben Welden as Jerry Muller  
 Aubrey Mather as Sir Ralph Whitcombe  
 Stanley Vine as Lane 
 Richard Dolman as John Boscombe

References

Bibliography
 Chibnall, Steve. Quota Quickies: The Birth of the British 'B' Film. British Film Institute, 2007.

External links

1934 films
British crime films
1934 crime films
Films based on works by Edgar Wallace
Films directed by Henry Edwards
Films shot at Twickenham Film Studios
Films set in England
British black-and-white films
1930s English-language films
1930s British films